Şivlə (also, Shivlik) is a village and municipality in the Lerik Rayon of Azerbaijan. It has a population of 621. The municipality consists of the villages of Şivlə and Keskon.

References 
Notes

Bibliography

Populated places in Lerik District